Jeļena Ostapenko won the title, defeating defending champion Julia Görges in the final, 6–4, 6–1.

Seeds

Draw

Finals

Top half

Bottom half

Qualifying

Seeds

Qualifiers

Lucky loser
  Bibiane Schoofs

Draw

First qualifier

Second qualifier

Third qualifier

Fourth qualifier

References

External links
 Main draw
 Qualifying draw

BGL Luxembourg Open - Singles
Luxembourg Open
2019 in Luxembourgian tennis